John Crichton-Stuart, 4th Marquess of Bute, KT (20 June 1881 – 25 April 1947), was a Scottish peer.

Biography
Lord Bute was born at Chiswick House in Chiswick, London. He was the son of The 3rd Marquess of Bute and Hon. Gwendolen Fitzalan-Howard, a daughter of The 1st Baron Howard of Glossop and granddaughter of The 13th Duke of Norfolk.

He was educated at Harrow School, and succeeded his father as Marquess of Bute in October 1900, when he was nineteen years old. In early 1902 he was on a tour in the Far East. On reaching his majority in June 1902, he received the Honorary Freedom of the Burgh of Rothesay, and later the same month took the oath and his seat in the House of Lords. The 4th marquess, who, like his father, was a Knight of the Thistle.

He also had a passion for architecture and was responsible for restoring Caerphilly Castle in South Wales. In 1936 he published a pamphlet entitled "A Plea for Scotland's Architectural Heritage", which argued for the preservation of Scotland's smaller burgh dwellings and advocated reconditioning traditional working class housing, rather than wholesale demolition. He became "the man who sold a city" when, in 1938, he disposed of the remaining Bute family estate in Cardiff.

Family life
On 6 July 1905, the young Lord Bute married Augusta Bellingham, daughter of Sir (Alan) Henry Bellingham, 4th Baronet, and Catherine Noel. The lavish wedding, at Bellingham Castle in the village of Castlebellingham in County Louth, Ireland, was followed by a party at Mount Stuart House in Scotland. A film company was employed to film the event, one of the earliest examples of the aristocratic classes making a private film.

They had seven children:

 Lady Mary Crichton-Stuart (8 May 1906 – 1980); married Edward Walker and had issue.
 John Crichton-Stuart, 5th Marquess of Bute (4 August 1907 – 14 August 1956)
 Lady Jean Crichton-Stuart (28 October 1908 – 23 October 1995); married Lt.-Cmdr. Hon. James Bertie and had issue (two sons); her elder son was Fra' Andrew Willoughby Ninian Bertie, Prince and Grand Master of the Sovereign Military Order of Malta from 1988 until his death in 2008.
 Lord Robert Crichton-Stuart (12 December 1909 – 26 June 1976); married Lady Janet Egida Montgomerie (1911–1999), daughter of Archibald Montgomerie, 16th Earl of Eglinton and had issue.
 Lord David Crichton-Stuart (8 February 1911 – 3 March 1970); married Ursula Packe and had issue.
 Lord Patrick Crichton-Stuart (1 February 1913 – 5 February 1956); married Jane von Bahr and had issue.
 Captain Lord Rhidian Crichton-Stuart (4 June 1917 – 25 June 1969); married Selina van Wijk and had issue.

Ancestry

References
 Wales on line

External links
 

Scotland on Screen Wedding of the 4th Marquis of Bute in 1905 – Scotland's first wedding film

1881 births
1947 deaths
People educated at Harrow School
British Roman Catholics
4
Knights of the Thistle
Lord-Lieutenants of Buteshire
20th-century Roman Catholics
21st-century Roman Catholics
Scottish Roman Catholics